Los Angeles City Council District 7 is one of the 15 districts of the Los Angeles City Council. It covers much of the northeastern San Fernando Valley. On May 16, 2017, Monica Rodriguez was elected to fill the open seat following the resignation of Felipe Fuentes and was sworn in as a council member on July 1, 2017.

District geography

The Seventh District includes the following neighborhoods:

 Sylmar
 Mission HIlls
 Pacoima
 Sunland-Tujunga
 Lake View Terrace
 Shadow Hills
 La Tuna Canyon
 Northern portion of North Hills East

The certified Neighborhood Councils whose jurisdictions fall within the City Council District are: Sylmar, Mission Hills, Pacoima, North Hills East, Foothill Trails District, Sunland-Tujunga and very small portions of the Sun Valley Area.

The Los Angeles Police Department Divisions within the district are the Mission and Foothill divisions. The whole district is covered by the Los Angeles Fire Department's 12th Battalion in their North Division and contains the following Fire Districts: 7 covering North Hills East, 24 covering Lake View Terrace and part of Tujunga, 74 covering Sunland-Tujunga, 75 covering Mission Hills, 77 covering Shadow Hills and La Tuna Canyon, 91 covering Sylmar, and 98 covering Pacoima. The council district is within the East Valley LADOT Engineering District.

Boundary 
The borders of the Council District as of the 2021 ordinance are formed by the following line: starting from the northwest point at the cross between the I-5 and the Los Angeles city limit, following that limit into the Sunland-Tujunga region, until the crossing of the Los Angeles and Glendale city boundaries near Mount Lukens. The border follows the city boundaries south then to the west until a point near La Tuna Peak in the Verdugo Mountains. Starting at this point, the district border separates from the city boundaries and starts to be bound briefly with the second district northwest through Verdugo Mountain Park until moving in a straight line west into Vinedale Street to its intersection with Glenoaks Boulevard. At this intersection the district begins to be bound with the sixth district. The border follows Glenoaks briefly north then Sunland Boulevard until turning northwest, separating a residential area in Shadow Hills to the northeast from the Vulcan landfill in the oppposite side until reaching Wentworth Street, following it northeast until it reaches the Hansen Dam Municipal Golf Course where it splits westward following the golf course's south boundary until splitting to the southwest at Branford Street. The border follows Branford southwest until reaching the I-5 which it then follows northward intil its interchange with the 118. From this interchange it moves southward following the Pacoima Wash and splitting southward through the Pacoima Spreading Grounds to the intersection with Natick Avenue and Woodman Avenue, following the latter briefly south until its intersection with Lassen Street. The border follows Lassen briefly westward until turning south once again into the Pacoima Wash. It follows the wash until Nordhoff Street, turning into it briefly west until turning south into Noble Avenue, then west again into Rayen Street until reaching the I-405. At this point the border bounds the district with the twelfth district. From Rayen and the 405, the border moves north following the 405 into the I-5 up until it returns to the city limit. The district does not include the City of San Fernando, which lies inside of the boundary.

For all the neighborhoods and communities represented, see the official City of Los Angeles Map of District 7, showing its boundaries.

Historic locations

A new city charter effective in 1925 replaced the former plurality-at-large voting system for a nine-member city council within a district system, having a 15-member council. Each district was to be approximately equal in population, based upon the voting in the previous gubernatorial election, so redistricting was done every four years. In the present day, redistricting is done every ten years, based upon the preceding U.S. census results. The numbering system established in 1925 for City Council districts began with No. 1 in the north of the city, in the San Fernando Valley, and ended with No. 15 in the south, in the Harbor area.

At the beginning, the Seventh District was situated south of Downtown Los Angeles. It was moved to the San Fernando Valley in 1956.

1925: Bounded on the north by Jefferson Boulevard, on the south by Slauson Boulevard, on the west by Vermont Avenue and on the east by South Park Avenue.

1926: 46th Street, Jefferson Boulevard, Vermont and Alameda avenues, with district headquarters at 529 West 41st Place.

1928: Same as above, with the addition of the Exposition-Vermont-Vernon-Arlington area.

1932–33: On the east by Alameda Avenue, on the west by Crenshaw Boulevard, on the north by Exposition Boulevard and on the south by Vernon Avenue.

1937: On the west by Crenshaw Boulevard, on the north by Exposition Boulevard, on the east by the city boundary with Vernon and on the south by Vernon Avenue.

1940: Same as above.

1947. It was noted that the district's population was "nearly 50 per cent Negro."

1956: Move to the San Fernando Valley, after Councilman Don A. Allen was elected to the State Assembly. North: City boundary; south: Riverside Drive; east, Coldwater Canyon and Woodman Avenues; west, generally Balboa Boulevard.

1961: Van Nuys, Sepulveda, Granada Hills and Sylmar.

1986: Panorama City, part of Sun Valley and Sylmar.

1993: A 70% Latino and 19% African-American council district that covered "much of the northeast Valley" encompassing "one of Los Angeles's poorest areas" and containing "the shuttered General Motors plant in Van Nuys as well as Blythe Street in Panorama City, one of the Valley's most drug-infested areas until a police crackdown." 
Registered voters were 39% Anglo, 30% Latino and 19% African-American.

Officeholders
The 7th District has been represented by eleven men and one woman.

Downtown

San Fernando Valley

See also
 Los Angeles City Council districts
 List of Los Angeles municipal election returns
 San Fernando Valley-related list

References

Note: Most of the Los Angeles Times links require the use of a library card.

External links
 Official Los Angeles City Council District 7 website
 City of Los Angeles: Map of District 7

LACD07
LACD07
Lake View Terrace, Los Angeles
Mission Hills, Los Angeles
Pacoima, Los Angeles
Sylmar, Los Angeles